Comitas margaritae is a species of sea snail, a marine gastropod mollusc in the family Pseudomelatomidae, the turrids and allies. 

Judging from the figure, K.H. Barnard thought this species almost indistinguishable from Comitas stolida (Hinds, 1843)

Description
The length of the shell attains 60 mm, its diameter 20 mm.

The shell has a fusiform shape. Its color is white, but the epidermis is assumed yellowish. The  spire is acuminate and turreted. The shell contains about 12 whorls. These are angulate in the middle and show obliquely nodular plicae (these are more attenuate in the lower portions). The whorls are concave above and subconvex below. In the body whorl there is a slight convexity or rounded ridge just below the suture and above the excavation, below which occur the oblique nodose plications which gradually diminish in strength as the aperture is approached. The aperture is elongate and pear-shaped. The 
outer lip is tenuous, widely sinuate and prominently arcuate in the middle. The columella is upright in the middle and oblique anteriorly.

Distribution
This marine species occurs off the Andaman Islands

References

External links
 

margaritae
Gastropods described in 1904